Stewartown is an unincorporated community in Loudoun County, Virginia. Stewartown is nestled within Buchannon Gap in the Bull Run Mountains.

Unincorporated communities in Loudoun County, Virginia
Washington metropolitan area
Unincorporated communities in Virginia